Nevada is a state located in the Western United States. According to the 2020 United States Census, it is the 32nd most populous state, with  inhabitants, but the 7th largest by land area spanning . Nevada is divided into 17 counties and contains 19 municipalities.

Municipalities in the state are legally described as cities, except for the state capital Carson City, which has no legal description but is considered an independent city as it is not located in any county. To incorporate, a petition for incorporation can be made to the board of county commissioners, who consider numerous geographic, demographic, and economic factors. Cities are categorized by population for the purpose of determining the number of wards  and council election structure as well as the number of city clerks: cities with 50,000 or more inhabitants are in population category one, cities with 5,000 or more but fewer than 50,000 inhabitants are in population category two, and cities having fewer than 5,000 inhabitants are in population category three. Cities are responsible for providing local services such as fire and police protection, road maintenance, water distribution, and sewer maintenance.

The largest municipality by population in Nevada is Las Vegas with 641,903 residents, and the smallest is Caliente with 990 residents.

Municipalities

See also
 List of census-designated places in Nevada
 List of counties in Nevada

Notes

References

 
Nevada
Cities